Suffrajett is an American rock band from New York City, currently based in Chicago, Illinois, composed of singer/violinist Simi Sernaker, guitarist Jason Chasko, bassist Kevin Roberts, and drummer Danny Severson. Suffrajett has toured with Local H, The Last Vegas, and Bob Schneider, and have opened for the reunited MC5. Suffrajett released their self-titled debut album on February 2, 2003, and their latest album Black Glitter was released on January 1, 2007. They recently toured with Juliette and the Licks and Scissors for Lefty.

Discography

Albums
Suffrajett (February 2, 2003) released on in Music We Trust Records
Black Glitter (January 1, 2007) released on Cobra Music

EPs
Suffrajett EP (September 25, 2005) released on Giant Step Records

Singles
 "Mr. Man"
 "Closer"
 "Anybody Listening"

Trivia
Simi was a part of the Sistagrrl Riott
Suffrajett appeared in the film, I'll Always Know What You Did Last Summer, with their song "Between You and Me" (Written by Jason Chasko, Simantha Sernaker and Wesley Kidd)
Jason Chasko had worked with Liz Phair as co-songwriter and co-producer on Phair's Whitechocolatespaceegg
Simantha Sernaker performs on Local H's "Hand's on the Bible" from their album Here Comes the Zoo
Simantha Sernaker appeared in the comedy short Strike! as Niki
Simi played the violin with Badawi aka – Raz Mesinai

External links
Suffrajett MySpace Page
Suffrajett: Song samples and CD info

Garage rock groups from Illinois
Musical groups established in 2003
Musical groups from Chicago